The Washington Secretary of State election, 2012, took place on November 6, 2012. Republican Kim Wyman was narrowly elected Secretary of State to succeed incumbent Republican Sam Reed, who did not seek re-election.

Primary election

The primary election took place in August. Under Washington's top-two primary system, introduced in the early 2000s, the primary was designed to narrow the field of candidates to two, rather than select specific party nominees, and candidates could designate themselves as affiliated with any political party, whether it existed or not.

Seven candidates contested the primary: 
 Thurston County Auditor Kim Wyman ran under the Republican Party designation. 
 Karen Murray ran under the Constitution Party designation. 
 Sam Wright ran under the Human Rights Party designation. 
 David J. Anderson ran as an independent candidate. 
 Former Seattle mayor Greg Nickels, state senator Jim Kastama, and former state legislator Kathleen Drew, all ran under the Democratic Party designation.

Wyman and Drew scored the most votes in the primary contest, thereby becoming the two candidates to advance to the general election. Wyman received 39.75-percent of the vote and Drew 21.73-percent.

General election

Republican Kim Wyman won the general election in a close-fought contest, and was the only Republican elected to statewide office in Washington. She was endorsed in the election by the Walla Walla Union-Bulletin, The Wenatchee World, the Tri-City Herald, and The Seattle Times. She was also endorsed by the Washington Education Association, which typically endorsed Democrats.

With Wyman's victory, Republicans extended their control of the office of Secretary of State of Washington to 48 consecutive years, having won each of the preceding 12 elections.

Polling
Graphical summary

By congressional district

Wyman won 6 of 10 congressional districts, including 3 that also went for Barack Obama.

References

secretary of state
2012
2012 United States state secretary of state elections
November 2012 events in the United States